Guns & Ammo is a magazine dedicated to firearms, hunting, competitive shooting, reloading, and other shooting-related activities in the United States.

The magazine offers reviews on firearms, ammunition, optics and shooting gear. Also included are historical articles, gun collecting, self-defense features, celebrity interviews and information relating to gun politics. In addition to departments, each issue contains several featured articles and profiles of the firearms industry, as well as technical evaluations new products. It has a total print and digital readership of 10.2 million per month, including a pass-through rate of 12 per copy according to MediaMark Research Inc. (MRI). Guns & Ammo is published on a monthly basis.

History
Guns & Ammo was founded by Robert E. Petersen in 1958 and has featured famed gunwriters such as P.O. Ackley, Craig Boddington, Jeff Cooper, Garry James, Bill Jordan, Elmer Keith, Bob Milek, Patrick Sweeney, Col. Townsend Whelen and John Wooters. Former National Rifle Association president Charlton Heston authored a gun rights column for the magazine titled "From the Capitol" until 2007.

Currently, Guns & Ammo magazine carries columns written by Eric R. Poole (Editorial), Garry James (Gun Room), Richard Nance (Gun Tech), Jeremy Stafford (Handgunning), Tom Beckstrand (Rifles & Glass), retired SGM Kyle E. Lamb (Lock, Stock & Barrel), Dave Emary (Bullet Board) and Keith Wood (Spent Cases).

References

1958 establishments in the United States
Monthly magazines published in the United States
Sports magazines published in the United States
Firearms magazines
Hunting and fishing magazines
Magazines established in 1958
Magazines published in Illinois